Swan Songs is the debut studio album by American rap rock band Hollywood Undead. It was released through Octone Records and Polydor Records on September 2, 2008. "Everywhere I Go" was the first single to be released, it was a web single and was available for download only on iTunes. The band released four music videos for four songs on the album, "No. 5", "Undead", "Young", and "Everywhere I Go." When purchased through Amazon.com and at some other retailers, the album includes a bonus track and an option to unlock music videos.

Background
Swan Songs was supposed to be released on the band's original label, MySpace Records in 2007, however it was postponed by the record label when they requested to have some of the songs removed and others censored. The band declined and switched labels to Octone which wouldn't require them to censor their songs. 
The song "Undead" is featured in the video games UFC Undisputed 2009 and Madden NFL 09. The song "Young" is featured as downloadable content for Rock Band 2.

Critical reception
Swan Songs received mostly mixed reviews. Dave Donnelly of AllMusic gave the album a 2 out of 5 stars, saying that the lyrics were uninteresting and that the album was "given over to ironic frat-boy party rap" (using the singles "Everywhere I Go" and "No. 5" as examples).

Commercial performance
The album debuted at number 22 on the US Billboard 200 selling 21,000 copies in its first week.<ref name=billboard>{{cite magazine |url=http://www.billboard.com/articles/news/1044130/young-jeezy-nets-second-album-chart-topper |title=Young Jeezy Nets Second Album Chart-Topper. |magazine=Billboard |access-date= September 13, 2008}}</ref>

Track listing
All tracks are written and performed by Hollywood Undead, with specific writers detailed for each track.

Personnel
Credits for Swan Songs'' adapted from Allmusic.

Hollywood Undead
Aron "Deuce" Erlichman – lead vocals, bass guitar, keyboards, executive production, engineering (tracks: 1–2, 4–9 and 11-13, bonus tracks 15-21), programming (tracks: 1–2, 4–9 and 11-13, bonus tracks 15-21), mixing (track: 13, bonus tracks 15-21), guitar (track 8)
Jordon "Charlie Scene" Terrell – vocals (tracks: 1, 3–5, 7, 9-11, and 13, bonus tracks 15-19), guitars (on all tracks except on track 8)
Jorel "J-Dog" Decker – vocals (tracks: 1-2, 5–7, and 9-11, bonus tracks 16-20), keyboards (tracks: 1, 6-7, and 11, bonus track 20)
George "Johnny 3 Tears" Ragan – vocals (tracks: 1-2, 5-7, and 9-14, bonus tracks 15-16, 18-19, and 21)
Dylan "Funny Man" Alvarez – vocals (tracks: 1, 4–5, 9, and 13, bonus tracks 16 and 19)
Matthew "Da Kurlzz" Busek – vocals (tracks: 1-3, 5-6, and 9-11, bonus tracks 16-17 and 19), drums (tracks: 5, 7, 9, and 11, bonus tracks 16-19), percussion (tracks: 5, 7, 9, and 11, bonus tracks 16-19)

Additional musicians
 Josh Freese – drums (tracks: 1, 6 and 11)
 Danny Lohner – guitars (tracks: 2, 8 and 14), engineering, production
 Paul Pavao – guitar (track 6)
 Dean Saenz – drums (track 2)
 Jeffrey "Shady Jeff" Phillips – vocals (bonus tracks 17 and 20) 
 John Tempesta – drums (track 14)

Production

 Don Gilmore – production
 Billy Howerdel – engineering
 Mark Kiczula – assistant
 Ben Grosse – mixing

 Jonas Åkerlund – art direction, photography
 Jason Goad – illustrations
 Fox Phelps – assistant
 Jimmy Yuma – assistant, production

Charts

Weekly charts

Year-end charts

Release history

Certifications

References

2008 debut albums
Hollywood Undead albums
A&M Octone Records albums
Albums produced by Danny Lohner
Interscope Geffen A&M Records albums